XHPMI-FM is a radio station on 100.7 FM in Peñamiller, Querétaro. The station is owned by the civil association Radio Cultural de Villa del Carbón, A.C.

History
Radio Cultural de Villa del Carbón filed for a radio station permit on July 29, 2013. The station was awarded on May 23, 2018. Test transmissions began in December 2018, bringing Peñamiller its first-ever legal radio service.

References

Radio stations in Querétaro